Horseshoe Bay Trail is a  trail that enters and loops through the Horseshoe Bay Wilderness.

Trail layout
0.0 - Trailhead at Foley Creek Campground
1.1 - Lake Huron Shore (Trail Ends)
2.9 - First Point
3.2 - Second Point; Turnaround Point
6.4 - Trailhead

References

Hiking trails in Michigan
Protected areas of Mackinac County, Michigan